Leif Sylvester Petersen, (born 18 April 1940) in Copenhagen, also known as Leif Sylvester, is a Danish painter, graphic artist, musician and actor. He originally trained as a carpenter, but has simultaneously worked as a musician and artist.

Petersen debuted in the late 1960 when he was the artists' exhibition was deeply disappointed with the launch of the established art. The same was Erik Clausen and together they began to exhibit in the streets and eventually to perform community satirical entertainment. Sylvester was about to make art, but at the same time he became involved in theater and music.

Clausen & Petersen made a series of plates and Sylvester formed the band Sylvester and Swallows, which also released several albums. He lives today of his art, but help on rare occasions in the film. Most recently, he exhibited at Sofie Holm. Among his decorations in public spaces is the bronze sculpture "That's it". Sylvester-Petersen's family grave at Assistants Cemetery in Copenhagen.

Leif Sylvester Petersen took his stage name Sylvester as real name, after being mistaken for the author Leif Petersen born 1934.

Filmography

Film

TV Series

References

External links

1940 births
Danish sculptors
Danish male artists
Danish male actors
Danish male film actors
Artists from Copenhagen
Musicians from Copenhagen
Male actors from Copenhagen
Living people
Male sculptors
Bodil Honorary Award recipients